The Big Lift is a 1950 American drama war film on location in the city of Berlin, Germany, that tells the story of "Operation Vittles", the 1948–49 Berlin Airlift, through the experiences of two U.S. Air Force sergeants (played by Montgomery Clift and Paul Douglas).

The film was directed and written by George Seaton, and was released April 26, 1950, less than one year after the Soviet blockade of Berlin was lifted and airlift operations ceased.  Because the film was shot in Berlin in 1949, as well as using newsreel footage of the actual airlift, it provides a contemporary glimpse of the post-war state of the city as its people struggled to recover from the devastation wrought by World War II.

Plot
Off-duty American airmen of the 19th Troop Carrier Squadron in Hawaii are ordered to report to their squadron in July 1948. What is briefed as a temporary "training assignment" in the United States becomes a flight halfway around the world to Germany for the C-54 Skymasters of the 19th, where the Soviets have blockaded Berlin in an attempt to force out the Allies by starving the city. Tech Sgt. Danny MacCullough (Montgomery Clift), flight engineer of a C-54 nicknamed The White Hibiscus, is immediately ordered to fly with his crew from Frankfurt into Tempelhof Airport to deliver a load of coal. His friend Master Sgt. Hank Kowalski (Paul Douglas), a ground-controlled approach (GCA) operator, hitches a ride with them to his new station. Hank, a POW during World War II, resents the German people and goes out of his way to be rude and overbearing to them. Danny on the other hand is frustrated at being restricted to the airport because of the necessity of quickly offloading and returning to Frankfurt.

Months later, the crew of "Big Easy 37" (a call sign, airlift shorthand for an eastbound C-54) rename their airplane Der Schwarze (The Black) Hibiscus because of the grimy soot that has accumulated in it from hauling coal. They become temporary celebrities on a mission when they are the 100,000th flight of "Operation Vittles" into Berlin. Danny is immediately enamored of Frederica Burkhardt (Cornell Borchers), an attractive German war widow chosen to thank him on behalf of the women of Berlin. When a news correspondent covering the ceremony recruits Danny for a public relations stunt, Danny jumps at the opportunity as a means of getting a pass in Berlin and seeing Frederica again. During a tour of the city, Danny's uniform is accidentally covered with poster paste, so until it is cleaned, despite the penalty if he were to be caught out of uniform, he borrows some civilian working clothes. At a night club, they meet Hank and his "Schatzi", the friendly and intelligent Gerda, but Hank is rude to Frederica and treats Gerda as an inferior. Hank chances to see the former prison guard who tortured him as a POW, and, following him outside, beats him nearly to death. Danny is able to stop Hank only by knocking him down. Mistaken for a German attacking Hank, he is chased into the Soviet occupation zone by military police.

Danny and Frederica narrowly escape back into the American zone, where Hank is waiting for them at Frederica's apartment and has unexpectedly befriended her neighbor and Danny's friend, Herr Stieber (O.E. Hasse), a self-professed "Soviet spy", but in fact he is working for the Allies and providing the Soviets with false information. Danny falls in love with Frederica, despite learning from Hank that she lied to him about the backgrounds of her dead husband and father. When Danny receives notice that he is due to rotate back to the United States soon, he arranges to marry Frederica. However, Stieber suspects duplicity in Frederica and intercepts a letter she has written to her German lover living in the United States, revealing that she intends to divorce Danny back in the U.S. as soon as she legally can, and see her lover behind his back until that happens.

In the meantime, Hank, in trying to teach Gerda the meaning of democracy (and now deeply ashamed of the beating he inflicted on the former guard), comes to see that he has been hypocritical in his own actions toward Germans. He begins treating Gerda as an equal and with affection as they meet Frederica to be witnesses to the wedding. When Danny arrives, he tells Frederica she will have to wait a long time, if ever, to get to America, and gives her the letter which Stieber had given to Danny. Gerda tells Hank she prefers to stay in Germany and do her small part in helping rebuild the country, and Hank reveals to Danny that he is not going home but has switched his temporary assignment in Berlin to permanent duty. Danny's flight out departs, amidst rumors that the Russians will soon end the blockade.

Cast

 Montgomery Clift as T/Sgt. Danny MacCullough
 Paul Douglas as M/Sgt. Hank Kowalski
 Cornell Borchers as Frederica Burkhardt
 Bruni Löbel as Gerda
 O.E. Hasse as Stieber

Production
All military roles except those of Clift and Douglas were portrayed by actual military personnel stationed in Germany as themselves. The 19th Troop Carrier Squadron was an actual Air Force unit based in Hawaii and was one of the first to deploy for Operation Vittles in July 1948. However it participated only until August 26, when it was inactivated and its personnel and equipment absorbed into the 53rd Troop Carrier Squadron at Rhein-Main Air Base as depicted in The Big Lift. The copilot of Der Schwarze Hibiscus, 1st Lt. Alfred L. Freiburger, was a C-54 pilot with the 14th Troop Carrier Squadron who had participated in the final months of Operation Vittles.

The production crew for The Big Lift arrived in Berlin in May 1949 just as the blockade was lifted by the Russians, and shot actual airlift activity at both terminals. Principal shooting began in July. Montgomery Clift became available after he dropped out of the film Sunset Blvd., in which he was to have been the lead, before shooting began in June. Even so, all scenes involving him were shot first to allow him to return to the United States to begin location shooting for A Place in the Sun in October.

German actress Hildegard Knef had been cast in the role of Frederica Burkhardt, her first lead role in an American film, and arrived in Berlin on June 16. However director George Seaton and producer William Perlberg had in the meantime been made aware of the circumstances of her wartime relationship with Ewald von Demandowsky, Nazi head of Tobis Film. Knef had posed as a Nazi soldier to remain near him when he became an officer in the SS near the end of the war. After their capture in Poland and subsequent release, he told US investigators that they had in fact wedded during their period as prisoners of war, trying unsuccessfully to avoid being turned over to the Soviets for prosecution. Because of the possibility of her negative impact on the film due to its theme of fraternization, which was still a volatile issue—and a general coolness towards her by the Hollywood community as a result of the revelation—Knef was fired and replaced by relative newcomer Cornell Borchers.

Aerial sequences were accomplished, often in bad weather to demonstrate conditions under which the airlift was flown, using a Fairchild C-82 Packet as a camera platform, taking advantage of its removable rear fuselage to take panoramic shots of up to 170 degrees. Seaton reported that he finally overcame political complications with Soviet authorities to complete location shooting inside the Brandenburg Gate, which was in the Soviet zone, but that on the day of the shooting the Soviets set up loudspeakers to harass the set with propaganda. The scene was shot without sound and dialogue was later added by dubbing.

Reception
Bosley Crowther of The New Yorker wrote that the film "merits favor without too high acclaim," finding "many vividly realistic scenes that are aimed to describe the toil and daring of the airlift enterprise," but also that it "lacks cohesion, clarity or magnitude." Variety praised it for a "masterful scripting job" and "a couple of winning performances" from Clift and Douglas. Richard L. Coe of The Washington Post wrote that "you should see it," and found the airlift scenes "finely pictured," but thought director Seaton "tries to do too much," with the explanations of the Douglas character to his girlfriend about democracy running "too obtrusively, artificially, through the picture." Harrison's Reports called it "an absorbing postwar drama," with the depiction of the airlift operations "taut and exciting." John McCarten of The New Yorker liked most of the picture, calling it "a good movie as long as it sticks to the impressive actuality that inspired it," though he was less impressed with the "fairly routine romantic and comic doings." The Monthly Film Bulletin called Seaton's effort "half hearted. Having found promising material, he shies off it, indulges in too many contrivances, plays some sequences for rather heavy-handed comedy, resolves the situation with facile tricks and glib dialogue."

References
Specific citations

General references

 Daum, Andreas W. "America's Berlin, 1945‒2000: Between Myths and Visions". In Frank Trommler (ed.), Berlin: The New Capital in the East. The American Institute for Contemporary German Studies, Johns Hopkins University, 2000, pp. 49–73, online.
 Provan, John, and Davies, R. E. G., "Berlin Airlift: The Effort and the Aircraft", Paladwr Press, McLean, Virginia, p. 64.

External links
 
 
 
 
 
 

1950 films
1950s war drama films
Berlin Blockade
American aviation films
American war drama films
American black-and-white films
Cold War aviation films
Films directed by George Seaton
Films set in Berlin
Films shot in Berlin
20th Century Fox films
Films scored by Alfred Newman
1950 drama films
1950s English-language films
1950s American films